The Committee for the Environment was a Northern Ireland Assembly committee established to advise, assist and scrutinise the work of the Department of the Environment and Minister of the Environment. The committee also played a key role in the consultation, consideration and development of new legislation.

The committee was abolished in 2016 because the Department of Environment was closed and its mandate was transferred to other departments.

Membership 
Membership of the committee before the closure of the DoE:

See also 
 Committee

References

External links 
 Committee for the Environment

Northern Ireland Assembly